Heterocithara hirsuta is a species of sea snail, a marine gastropod mollusk in the family Mangeliidae.

Description
The length of the shell attains 3.4 mm. The shell is yellowish white, the earlier whorls darker.

Distribution
This marine species is endemic to Australia and occurs off Queensland.

References

 De Folin, A.G.L. 1867. Les meleagrinicoles. Especes nouvelles. Publications de la Société Havraise d'Études. Diverses 33: 41–112, 6 pls
 Bouge, L.J. & Dautzenberg, P.L. 1914. Les Pleurotomides de la Nouvelle-Caledonie et de ses dependances. Journal de Conchyliologie 61: 123–214

External links
  Hedley, C. 1922. A revision of the Australian Turridae. Records of the Australian Museum 13(6): 213–359, pls 42–56 

hirsuta
Gastropods described in 1867